Dystrichothorax vittipennis is a species of ground beetle in the subfamily Psydrinae. It was described by Sloane in 1911.

References

vittipennis
Beetles described in 1911